Talysh is a historical and geographical region near the southwestern coast of the Caspian Sea, an area of compact residence of the Talysh. It got its name from the ethnonym of the Talysh people inhabiting it. Talish is divided between two states: Azerbaijan (Mugan) and Iran (Gilan and Ardabil).

Ancient history 
In ancient times, Cadusii lived here (ancient Greek Καδούσιοι, Kadoúsioi, Lat. Cadusii) - a powerful Scythian tribethat was in constant enmity with its neighbors. The Cadussi lived on the western side of the Caspian Sea, south of the Aras, in the Median province of Atropatena (in the area of modern Iranian Azerbaijan and Gilan).Strabo them as a powerful mountain Scythian tribe of Gelae, fighting mainly on foot and well wielding a short sword or spear; they are excellent dart throwers; in mountainous places they fight instead of horsemen. Talysh are considered the descendants of the tribe Cadusii.

Middle Ages and Modern Times 
In medieval Arab historiography, the Talysh country was called al-Tailasan - the Arabic correspondence to the Persian "Talishan". Muhammad at-Tabari writes about the Talysh (calling them "Tailasan"): "In the mountains surrounding Aturpatakan there lived such peoples as the Gelae [and] Talysh, who did not obey the Arabs and retained their freedom and independence." According to the medieval Persian author Hamdalla Qazvini, the Tavalish region was located between the cities of Sultaniye and Ardabil (the name is the Arabic plural form of the word "Talish"). Another early mention of the country "Talysh", already under its own name, is contained in the Armenian edition of the 5th century. the novel “The Story of Alexander the Great”: “And he said that he was a refugee from the Caspian gates, near the country of Talish in the Gilan province” .

The famous religious and cultural figure of the 13th century Sheikh Zahid Gilani, whose mausoleum near Astara is still an object of veneration, came from the Talysh region. Although in the Middle Ages and Modern Times most of the people from Talish wrote in Persian, there is a whole group of poets who wrote in Talysh and the Gilani dialect close to it. The earliest Talysh poets include Seiyed Sharafshah Dulai, who lived in the 15th century.
In the second half of the 18th - early 19th, the Talysh Khanate existed in the region. During the Russian-Persian war, the Talysh khan Mir Mustafa Khan took the side of Russia. In 1809, the Talysh Khanate became a Russian protectorate. In early August 1812, a 20,000-strong Persian army blockaded Lankaran and on August 9 captured the fortress. By the end of December, a Russian detachment under the command of General Pyotr Kotlyarevsky approached Lankaran, and on the night of January 1, 1813 began an assault on the fortress, which ended with the fall of the citadel . According to the treaty of Gulistan, such places as Kargara, Namin and Zuvand passed from the Talysh Khanate to Persia. However, the Persian court did not accept the loss of Transcaucasia and insistently demanded a revision of the borders. First of all, this concerned the border in Talysh, which was not defined at all in the Gulistan Treaty.
In 1828, the Turkmanchay peace treaty was signed between Russia and Persia, which ended the next Russian-Persian war, according to which part of Zuvant was annexed to Talish, and most of Ujarri and part of the Astara magal (from the Astara River to Chilivan) went to Persia.
In accordance with the order of General Ivan Paskevich, the chief governor of Georgia, dated May 2, 1828, the “Provisional Talysh administration” was established under the leadership of a chairman (manager) appointed from Russian military ranks.
"Provisional Talysh gowerment" began to function on July 26, 1828. Until 1831 inclusive, it was directly subordinate to the chief governor in Georgia. But after the suppression of the uprising in March 1831 by the adherents of Mir-Hasan Khan, this "rule" was transferred to the jurisdiction of the military district chief of the Muslim provinces of the Transcaucasus in the city of Shusha (the so-called Administrator of Muslim provinces and the Talysh Khanate).
And on the basis of the "Institution for the administration of the Transcaucasian region" dated April 10, 1840, the "Provisional Talysh government" was abolished. In the same period, the Caspian region was formed on the territory of Transcaucasia, which consisted of 7 counties, one of which was Talyshinsky county. Finally, in 1846, on the basis of the “Regulations on the Division of the Transcaucasian Territory” dated December 14, 1845, the Talyshinsky district was renamed into Lenkoransky and became part of the newly formed Shemakha (from 1859 - Baku) province of the Russian Empire. At the turn of the 20th century, there lived a famous Talysh poet - Safibaba Roshan-dehi.

Talysh in the era of the Russian revolution 
In 1918, the Talysh-Mugan regions, where the local Muslim and Russian population, refused to submit to the newly formed Azerbaijan Republic. On August 4, 1918, the Provisional Military Dictatorship of Mugani ("Mugan Dictatorship") was created, initially recognizing the authority of the Rostov government of General Denikin, then (at the end of the year) submitting to the "Caucasian-Caspian government" of the military foreman Bicherakhov in Petrovsk (Makhachkala).

On December 28, 1918, in Lankaran, the local Russian and Muslim population made a decision on the autonomy of the Mugan Territory within Russia with the parliament (Regional Council) and the government (Regional Administration). On April 24, the "white" government was overthrown and Soviet power was established, after which on May 15-18, 1919, at the congress of revolutionary Mugan in Lenkoran, the Mugan Soviet Republic was proclaimed as part of the RSFSR.

On May 18, 1919, the Congress elected the Mugan Regional Council of Workers 'and Peasants' Deputies, who in turn elected the Regional Executive Committee (Executive Committee) headed by the Bolsheviks. One of the active leaders of the partisan movement in Mugan, a prominent participant in the revolutionary uprising of Lankaran, David Danilovich Chirkin, was elected chairman of the Regional Council; the congress approved one of the workers of the Lenkoran branch of the cooperative society "Samopomich" - Shirali Akhundov from the Talysh village of Khavzava [7]. The Revolutionary Military Council was also elected, headed by the political commissar (I. Talikhadze) and the Executive Committee, headed by the pre-executive committee (N. Tutyshkin). On July 23-25, 1919, Lankaran was taken by Azerbaijani troops, and the Mugan Soviet Republic was liquidated. From that moment on, Lankaran was part of Azerbaijan.

Talysh in the USSR 
In the 1920-1930s. Talysh was taught in elementary schools, books were published in Talysh and there was a newspaper called "Red Talysh". The most prominent Talysh figure of that era was the poet and educator Zolfaghar Ahmedzadeh, the author, in addition to the original Talysh poetry, Talysh textbooks and translations into the Talysh language of Russian classics. In total, about 500 titles of books have been published in the Talysh language. However, in 1937 Zulfigar Akhmedzade was arrested, and the study of the Talysh language and publications in it were completely curtailed. The language was studied only in an academic environment and functioned at the everyday level. From then until the end of the Soviet period, Talysh identity was brutally suppressed. From 1959 to 1989, the Talysh were not included in any censuses as a separate ethnic group, but were considered part of the Azerbaijani Turks, although the Talysh language belongs to the Indo-European language family.

Throughout the 65 years of the existence of the Azerbaijan SSR, the Talysh population felt itself the object of various restrictions on the part of the local authorities. who deliberately pursued a policy of assimilation of the Talysh region, and at the same time artificially limited its economic development. Kurds and Talysh were recorded as Azerbaijanis in their passports, and before independence, the country was not considered as separate nationalities when conducting population censuses in Azerbaijan.

Talysh after the collapse of the USSR 

Talysh-Mugan Autonomous Republic

Already in the late 1980s. a Talysh organization called the "Party of Talysh National Revival" was founded. In June 1992, the first official congress of the party took place, which took the name of the Talysh People's Party. The strategic goal of the party was declared the autonomy of the Talysh within Azerbaijan. Since they refused to register the party under this name, it was renamed the “Party of Equality of the Peoples of Azerbaijan”.

On June 21, 1993, in Lankaran, a group of Talysh officers led by Colonel Alikram Hummatov proclaimed the Talysh-Mugan Autonomous Republic. The uprising coincided with a large-scale offensive by Armenian troops on the Karabakh front and the capture of several regions in western Azerbaijan.The offensive caused a mutiny by Suret Huseynov and a general crisis of power in Azerbaijan, which resulted in the uprising of Talysh officers in Lankaran. Local authorities were formed and a constituent assembly called the National Mejlis. At the meeting of the Milli Mejlis, Alikram Hummatov was elected president of the autonomous republic, he met twice with the new head of Azerbaijan, Heydar Aliyev, but neither the first agreed to give up autonomy, nor the second - to recognize it. Two months later (23 August) the republic fell. Alikram Hummatov fled, but Azerbaijani loyalists handed him over to the law enforcement agencies of the Republic of Azerbaijan. The court sentenced Alikram Hummatov to death and after 10 years in prison, in 2004 he emigrated to Netherlands. Under the pretext of containing anti-constitutional goals in the program, the "Party of Equality of the Peoples of Azerbaijan" was banned, although it actually continued to exist.

Talysh national movement

After the release of Alikram Hummatov, an organization was created under the official name "Talysh National Movement". The headquarters of this organization is considered to be The Hague, where Hummatov lives; Alikram Hummatov  himself is its head; the organization is headed by a political council of 15 people. An important role in it is played by the former chairman of the People's Mejlis of the Talysh-Mugan Autonomous Republic, philosopher and political scientist Fahraddin Abbaszadeh, who emigrated to Russia in 1995, but returned to his homeland in 2005 and publishes the newspaper Shavnysht in thousands of copies (Night sittings ).Fahraddin Abbaszadeh compiles the "Grammar of the Talysh language" and the Talysh-Russian dictionary of 80 thousand words .

The Talysh national movement is held under the slogan of national autonomy. The demands formulated by Fahraddin Abbaszadeh on the eve of the presidential elections in Azerbaijan are as follows: radical change of the political regime; granting autonomy to all peoples of Azerbaijan; unconditional pro-Russian orientation, subject to equal relations with all other countries, including the United States.

Fahraddin Abbaszadeh himself, with his speeches in the Russian and Armenian media, is trying to awaken national consciousness.

In an appeal to the spiritual leader of the Islamic Republic of Iran, Ayatollah Khamenei, he declares that the Talysh people cannot exist outside Iran and asks him for protection from the Azerbaijani authorities.

In July 2018, Fahraddin Abbaszadeh was detained by the Russian authorities and at the beginning of 2019 extradited to Azerbaijan, where he was brought to trial for anti-state activities. When studying the materials on the basis of which the accusatory decision was made, the international human rights organization Amnesty International, in its report "Azerbaijan authorities must release Talysh activists", concluded that none of these materials contains evidence of any recognized crimes in accordance with international law and standards, or contains any incitement to acts of violence. Calls for secession are protected by international law, and Abbasov exercised his right to freedom of expression in upholding his vision of an independent Talysh state. 

On July 15, 2018, a group of young activists, together with Alikram Hummatov, formed the government of the Talysh-Mugan Autonomous Republic in exile. The government sends letters and statements to international organizations, states and world human rights organizations to reflect the position of the Talysh in the country. Calls on the Azerbaijani government to end discrimination against Talysh, demands that the Talysh language be taught in schools and that Talysh people can earn their living in their own country, and not be forced to go abroad. All government ministers of the Talysh-Mugan Autonomous Republic live in exile, in countries such as the Netherlands .

See also
 Talysh-Mughan Autonomous Republic
 The National Talysh Movement
 Storming of Lankaran
 Citadel of Cadusii

Reference 

 The National Talysh Movement
 TALYSH MUHAN REPUBLIC
 TALYSH ISSUE, DORMANT IN AZERBAIJAN, REOPENED IN ARMENIA
 AZERBAIJAN AUTHORITIES MUST RELEASE TALYSH ACTIVISTS
 James B. Minahan. Encyclopedia of Stateless Nations: Ethnic and National Groups around the world. — Santa Barbara, California: ABC-CLIO, LLC, 2016. — p. 409. — .
 Ethnic conflicts in the Caucasus, 1988-1994
 The government in exile supports the struggle in Azerbaijan = Regering in ballingschap ondersteunt strijd in Azerbeidzjan. // Vluchtelingen Dag krant. - Netherlands, 20.06.2019. - p. 4.
 Victor Schnirelmann. Wars of memory: myths, identity and politics in Transcaucasia / Reviewer: L.B. Alaev. - M .: Akademkniga, 2003 .-- p. 118 - .
 Привольный А. А. Над Муганью зарево Октября. — Азернешр. — Баку, 1967. — С. 92-93.— С. 199.
 Талыши//Талышские народные предания и сказки. Ереван, Кавказский центр иранистики, 2005, стр. 3-6
 Яна Амелина. Талыши не у дел //Незаивисимая газета, 10.09.2007
 Чичкин А. А. Друзья и враги за Кавказским хребтом. — М.: Вече, 2013. — С. 27. — 286 с. — .
 Исмаилов Э. Э. Генеалогия Талышинских-Талышхановых. — Б., 2001. — С. 10. — 82 с. — .
 Обозрение российских владений за Кавказом в статистическом, этнографическом, топографическом и финансовом отношениях. — СПб., 1836. — Т. 3. — С. 175—176.
 Азербайджанская ССР — статья из Большой советской энциклопедии. 
 The trial of the Talysh leader (chronology)

Sources 

 Philip Smith / The student's ancient history. The ancient history of the East
 I. Gershevitch / The Cambridge History of Iran
 Charles Anthon / Cornelius Nepos: With Notes, Historical and Explanatory
 William Smith / A New Classical Dictionary of Biography, Mythology, and Geography: Partly

Notes